Noppakao Dechaphatthanakun (born 9 September 1994), nicknamed Kao (เก้า) is a Thai actor, model, and singer. He is currently signed under Channel 3. He is best known for his roles in Until We Meet Again (TV series) (2019) and Lovely Writer: The Series (2021).

Early life and education
Noppakao Dechaphatthanakun was born on September 9, 1994, in Phayao. He graduated with a bachelor's degree from Rangsit University in the Faculty of Communication Arts.

Career

Acting 
In 2018, Noppakao began to enter the entertainment industry through auditions. He was well known during "2MoonsAudition" to be an actor in 2Moons: The Series. However, he didn't pass the audition. He made his debut in the same year as a support role Athida in Sapai Ka Fak, which was aired on Channel 3. In 2019, Noppakao was cast as Korn Ariyasakul in Until We Meet Again (TV series) and his popularity continued to grow rapidly after the series was aired.

In 2021, he was paired with Poompat Iam-samang in a new BL series Lovely Writer: The Series. The series was adapted from a novel by and it was aired on Channel 3. Later, the series was released on Channel 3 YouTube. The series ended with a great feedback from the audience.

In December 2021, it was reported that Noppakao signed a contract with Channel 3.

Music 
In 2020, Noppakao joined a special project called "BOYFRIEND" and it was led by the record label GMM Grammy. On October 6, 2020, he release his first single คิดได้ with Sapol Assawamunkong under the "BOYFRIEND" project.

Filmography

Film

Television

Discography

References

External links
 

1994 births
Living people
Noppakao Dechaphatthanakun
Noppakao Dechaphatthanakun
Noppakao Dechaphatthanakun
Noppakao Dechaphatthanakun